Duck Tape'n is a solo album by Michael "Prime Time" Williams with guest appearances by the duo Partners-N-Crime. It was released on July 28, 1999 for South Coast Music and was produced by Leroy "Precise" Edwards.

Track listing
"Intro"- :28
"Do You Really Wanna?"- 3:33
"Uptown Downtown"- 4:39
"She's Giving Me Love"- 4:16
"Coming Wit It!"- 4:40
"I Knew He Had It"- 3:40
"Crooked Cops"- 4:20
"You Don't Wanna!"- 5:01
"Make Money/Make Moves"- 3:20
"Good Fellas Skit"- :16
"We Act's a Ass"- 5:18
"Boy Tell Me What'cha Bout"- 4:22
"Tell Me Why"- 5:06
"Roll Call"- 1:19
"Where My Souljas At"- 4:10
"Pump tha Party World Wide '98"- 5:33
"Pump tha Party World Wide '98" (Radio Edit)- 5:33
"the moose is loose 98" (radio edit)- 5:10

1998 albums